The Malady Lingers On is a collection of eight videos by Morrissey released in late 1992. It includes all the promos shot between 1988 and 1992, bar Our Frank'''s.

The title of this compilation is taken from a sentence in the Marshall McLuhan and Quentin Fiore collido-scope The Medium is the Massage''. It was initially released on VHS in 1992 and was rereleased on DVD in 2004.

Track listing
 "Glamorous Glue"
 "Certain People I Know"
 "Tomorrow"
 "We Hate It When Our Friends Become Successful"
 "My Love Life"
 "You're the One for Me, Fatty"
 "Sing Your Life"
 "Pregnant for the Last Time"

Morrissey video albums
1992 video albums
1992 compilation albums
Music video compilation albums
EMI Records compilation albums